The Esab Open was a golf tournament on the Swedish Golf Tour and the Challenge Tour. The inaugural tournament was held in Örebro, then it moved to Kungsbacka, Sweden.

Winners

Notes

References

Former Challenge Tour events
Swedish Golf Tour events
Golf tournaments in Sweden
Recurring sporting events established in 1986
Recurring sporting events disestablished in 1990
1986 establishments in Sweden
1990 disestablishments in Sweden